Too Hot to Handle is an American-British reality television dating game show produced by Fremantle production companies Talkback and Thames. Created by Laura Gibson and Charlie Bennett, the show's eight-episode first season was released on Netflix on April 17, 2020. Hosted by a virtual assistant named "Lana", the show revolves around 10 adults – all of whom primarily engage in meaningless flings and are unable to form long-lasting relationships – who are placed together in a house for four weeks and must go through various workshops, all while being forbidden from any kissing, sexual contact or self-gratification, with the monetary prize getting reduced any time a rule is broken. 

In January 2021, the series was renewed for two more seasons, both of which were filmed back-to-back amid the COVID-19 pandemic on the Turks and Caicos Islands. The first half of the second season released June 23, 2021, followed by the second half the next week on June 30, 2021. The third season was released on January 19, 2022. The fourth season premiered on December 7, 2022. In January 2023, the series was renewed for a fifth season.

Premise
Hosted by a cone-shaped virtual assistant named "Lana", the show revolves around a group of adults – all of whom primarily engage in meaningless flings and are unable to form long-lasting relationships – who are placed together in a house for four weeks. When they arrive, the contestants believe they are on a totally different series and are surprised when its revealed that they are on Too Hot To Handle. While there, the contestants must go through various workshops, all while being forbidden from any kissing, sexual contact or self-gratification. The idea behind this is to foster genuine connections between the participants. The contestants start with a $100,000 grand prize that gets reduced any time a rule is broken.

Each season starts with 10 new contestants, although later new additions occasionally join throughout. Similarly, contestants who are unable to form connections in the house or commit to the process are sometimes kicked out.

Episodes

Season 1 (2020)

Season 2 (2021)

Season 3 (2022)

Season 4 (2022)

Production

Background
The show was created by Laura Gibson and developed by Charlie Bennett, citing Seinfeld episode, "The Contest" as their inspiration for the premise of Too Hot to Handle. Laura Gibson, creative director of Fremantle-owned production company Talkback, which produced the eight-part series, told Deadline Hollywood that she had been working to produce a dating show since 2016.

Viki Kolar and Jonno Richards, executive producers for Too Hot to Handle, said they found inspiration for the virtual character from artificial intelligence and virtual assistants, especially in video surveillance. Viki Kolar stated, "[A.I.] is literally everywhere around us. It's kind of governing us, it's taking over," in an interview with Glamour.

Development
On 5 May 2019, Netflix Studios, LLC applied to trademark the phrase "Too Hot to Handle" for all educational, training, entertainment, sporting, and cultural purposes. The application was approved on 24 June 2019, and was extended on 5 March 2020. This has been done with other Netflix original programs such as Stranger Things, The OA, and Big Mouth. Too Hot to Handle was produced by Fremantle production company Talkback.

The show, instead of using a human as their host, used a virtual assistant named Lana. Desiree Burch provided voice-over narration, making snarky and comedic remarks towards the contestants.

Casting
In 2018, Talkback announced that casting for an untitled reality television show was open. In total, over 3,000 people auditioned for the show; however, producer Louise Peet stated that the people who ultimately ended up being on the show stood out to the casting team and were chosen quickly.

Filming
A luxury resort called Casa Tau in Punta Mita, Mexico opened to guests in December 2018. Soon after, Too Hot to Handle started filming at Casa Tau in late-March 2019 and ended filming in April. After filming had ended, all fourteen contestants were able to spend several days at the resort with no cameras before going home.

Release
On 10 April 2020, Netflix released the trailer for the first season of Too Hot to Handle. The first season of Too Hot to Handle consisted of eight episodes, all of which were released on 17 April 2020 on Netflix. A reunion episode aired on 8 May 2020, where Desiree Burch interviewed the fourteen contestants. The first 4 episodes of second season premiered on June 23, 2021, while the remaining 6 episodes premiered on June 30, 2021. The third season was released on January 19, 2022. The first 5 episodes of the fourth season premiered on December 7, 2022.

Prize

Season 1
At the allocation ceremony, the ten remaining contestants became the winners.

Season 2
At the allocation ceremony, it came down to three contestants: Carly, Cam, and Marvin. The fellow finalists were the ones who voted for the winner, selecting Marvin as the winner of the  prize fund.

Season 3
At the allocation ceremony, it came down to four contestants: Beaux & Harry (as a couple), Georgia, and Nathan. The fellow finalists were the ones who voted for the winner, selecting Beaux and Harry as the winner of the  prize fund.

Season 4
At the allocation ceremony, it came down to two couples: Jawahir & Nick, and Kayla & Seb. The fellow finalists voted for the winner, with Jawahir & Nick winning the  prize fund with a final vote of 6 votes to 1.

Reception

Viewership 
Too Hot to Handle Season 1 became the #1 television program on Netflix during the week of April 20, 2020.

Too Hot To Handle Season 2 accumulated 111,680,000 hours watched while in the Netflix Global Top Ten, while Season 3 racked up 72,840,000 view hours and Season 4 scored 74,900,000 hours.

Critical response 
Review aggregator website Rotten Tomatoes gives the first season of Too Hot to Handle 36%, holding an average rating of 4.9 out of 10 from 28 reviews. Metacritic, which uses a weighted average, gives the series a metascore of 43 based on 13 reviews, indicating "mixed or average reviews".

Critic John Serba of Decider panned the show, describing it as "a mashup of Temptation Island, Love Island, "The Contest" episode of Seinfeld and The Peter Griffin Sideboob Hour", stating that "to call it tawdry is to engage in nuclear understatement", calling it "some of the dreckiest dreck ever drecked", and advising viewers to skip it.

Rachelle Hampton of Slate also wrote a negative review, stating: "Despite an irresistibly juicy premise, Too Hot to Handle doesn't know what kind of show it wants to be, and it suffers for lack of direction. (...) Its will-they-or-won't-they concept is ruined as soon as it becomes clear that, yes, they obviously will, even if it means losing tens of thousands of dollars."

International versions

References

External links
 
 

2020 American television series debuts
2020s American reality television series
American dating and relationship reality television series
2020 British television series debuts
2020s British reality television series
British dating and relationship reality television series
English-language Netflix original programming
Television shows filmed in Mexico
Television shows filmed in the Turks and Caicos Islands
Works about sexual abstinence
Television series by Fremantle (company)
Television shows produced by Thames Television